What Should Then Be Done O People of the East; Traveller was a philosophical poetry book in Persian of Muhammad Iqbal, a poet-philosopher of the Indian subcontinent. It was published in 1936. A translation, commentary and literary appreciation in Urdu by Elahi Bakhsh Akhtar Awan was published by University Book Agency Khyber Bazar, Peshawar, Pakistan in 1960.

The book includes the mathnavi Musafir. Iqbal's Rumi, the master, utters this glad tiding "East awakes from its slumbers" (Khwab-i ghaflat). Inspiring detailed commentary on voluntary poverty and free man, followed by an exposition of the mysteries of Islamic laws and sufic perceptions is given. He laments the dissention among the South Asians as well as Muslim nations. The book is an account of a journey to Afghanistan. In the Mathnavi, the people of the Sob'ha Sarhat region (Afghans) are counseled to learn the "secret of Islam" and to "build up the self" within themselves because they are a great righteous people. The title has also been translated as What Then Is to Be Done, O Nations of the East.

Topics 

 Preface
 Introduction
 Address to the World-illuminating Sun
 The Wisdom of Moses
 The Wisdom of the Pharaohs
 There is No Deity Except God
 Faqr
 The Free Man
 The Essence of the Shari'ah
 Lament on the Differences Among Indians
 Present-day Politics
 A Few Words to the Arab People
 What Should Then Be Done, O People of the East?
 To the Prophet
 Dedication

<div style="font-size: 90%">
 The Traveller
 Prelude
 Address to People of the Frontier
 The Traveller enters Kabul and visits the Mausoleum of the late Martyr King
 At the Tomb of the heaven Resting Babur
 Visiting Ghazni and offering Reverence to Hakim Sanai
 Sanai's Spirit Speaks from Heaven
 At the Tomb of Sultan Mahmud
 Supplication of Frenzied One
 Seeing Prophet's Garb at Qandhar.
 The Chant
 At the Mausoleum of Hadrat Ahmad Shah Baba, Founder of the Afghan Nation
 Talk with the King of Islam Zahir Shah.

See also 
 Index of Muhammad Iqbal–related articles
 1936 in poetry
 Javid Nama
 Payam-i-Mashriq
 Zabur-i-Ajam
 Bang-e-Dara
 Bal-e-Jibril
 Asrar-i-Khudi
 Rumuz-e-Bekhudi
 Zarb-i-Kalim
 Armaghan-i-Hijaz

References

External links 
Read online

Iqbal Academy, Pakistan

Iqbal Cyber Library

1936 poetry books
Persian poems
Islamic philosophical poetry books
Poetry by Muhammad Iqbal
Poetry collections